Abraham Aiyash is an American politician and LGBT activist serving as a member of the Michigan House of Representatives from the 4th district. The district covers much of Detroit's Midtown, New Center, North End, Boston Edison, Virginia Park, and all of the city of Hamtramck. He is a member of the Democratic Socialists of America.

Early life and education 
Aiyash was born and raised in Hamtramck, Michigan, the seventh of eight children. His parents immigrated to Michigan from Yemen. Aiyash was educated in the Hamtramck Public Schools and earned a Bachelor of Arts degree from Michigan State University, where he studied pre-medicine, political science, and Muslim studies.

Career 
When he was 13, Aiyash worked as a community organizer for the Barack Obama 2008 presidential campaign. In 2015 and 2016, he worked in the office of State Rep. Rose Mary Robinson.

In 2018, Aiyash was a candidate for the Democratic primary to represent Michigan's 2nd Senate district. He finished second after Adam Hollier, who won the general election. During his campaign, Aiyash was endorsed by the Detroit Free Press.

Abraham announced his candidacy for the 4th district of the Michigan House of Representatives following the death of Isaac Robinson in March 2020. In the Democratic primary, Aiyash placed first in a field of 13 candidates. He defeated Republican nominee Howard Weathington, Working Class Party candidate Linda Rayburn, and Independent MD Rabbi Alam in the November general election. He assumed office on December 1, 2020.

Electoral history

References

External links 
 Abraham Aiyash at ballotpedia.org

1994 births
American people of Yemeni descent
Democratic Party members of the Michigan House of Representatives
Democratic Socialists of America politicians from Michigan
Living people
Michigan State University alumni
People from Hamtramck, Michigan